Beka may refer to:

Places by country
 Beka, Burkina Faso
 Beka, Cameroon
 Beka or Bakka, Lebanon, a village, municipality and Roman temple
 Beka Valley or Beqaa Valley, Lebanon
 Beka, Khyber Pakhtunkhwa, Pakistan
 Beka, Pomeranian Voivodeship, Poland
 Beka, Hrpelje-Kozina, Slovenia

People
 Beka (name), Georgian masculine given name
 Abdelkader Fréha (1942–2012), nicknamed Beka, Algerian football player

Other uses
 Beka or Aka language, a Bantu language spoken in the Central African Republic and Republic of Congo
 Beka (weapon), a Russian PK machine gun
 Bêka & Lemoine, film production duo
 Beka Records, a record label from early 20th-century Germany
 Rebekah "Beka" Cooper, a character in the Provost's Dog trilogy by Tamora Pierce

See also
 Abeka, a publisher affiliated with Pensacola Christian College, Florida, U.S.